Les Deux Pigeons can refer to: 

 The Two Pigeons, a fable by Jean de la Fontaine 
 Les Deux Pigeons (ballet) with music by André Messager and a libretto based on the fable